Backman (also Bäckman) is a surname. Notable people with the surname include:

 Asta Backman (1917–2010), Finnish actress
 Christian Bäckman (born 1980), Swedish ice hockey player
 Derek Backman (born 1966), American soccer player
 Eric Backman (1896–1965), Swedish athlete
 Fredrik Backman (born 1981), Swedish author, blogger, and columnist
 Gunilla Backman (born 1965), Swedish singer, actress and musical artist
 Hans Backman (born 1963), Swedish politician
 Ingemar Backman (born 1976), Swedish snowboarder
 Jani Bäckman (born 1988), Finnish football player
 Johan Bäckman (born 1971), Finnish political author, legal sociologist and criminologist
 Karl Backman (born 1970), Swedish artist and musician
 Kennard Backman (born 1993), American football player
 Kjell Bäckman (1934–2019), Swedish speed skater
 Lars Bäckman (born 1945), Swedish chef
 Linnea Bäckman (born 1991), Swedish ice hockey player
 Mattias Bäckman (born 1992), Swedish ice hockey player
 Mike Backman (born 1955), Canadian ice hockey player
 Niklas Backman (born 1988), Swedish footballer
 Paul Backman (1920–1995), Finnish cyclist
 Per Bäckman (born 1950), Swedish ice hockey player
 Py Bäckman (born 1948), Swedish musician
 Robert L. Backman (1922–2022), American lawyer and politician
 Roland Bäckman (born 1960), Swedish politician
 Sarah Bäckman (born 1991), Swedish real estate broker and wrestler
 Sean Backman (born 1986), American ice hockey player
 Tomas Backman (born 1980), Swedish footballer
 Wally Backman (born 1959), American baseball player and manager
 Þuríður Backman (born 1948), Icelandic politician

See also 
 Bachman (disambiguation)
 Bachmann

Swedish-language surnames